Mannose-6-phosphate receptor binding protein 1 (M6PRBP1) is a protein which in humans is encoded by the M6PRBP1  gene. Its gene product, as well as the gene itself, is commonly known as TIP47.

Function 

Mannose 6-phosphate receptors (MPRs) deliver lysosomal hydrolase from the Golgi to endosomes and then return to the Golgi complex. The protein encoded by this gene interacts with the cytoplasmic domains of both cation-independent and cation-dependent MPRs, and is required for endosome-to-Golgi transport. This protein also binds directly to the GTPase RAB9 (RAB9A), a member of the RAS oncogene family. The interaction with RAB9 has been shown to increase the affinity of this protein for its cargo.

The mannose-6-phosphate receptor-binding properties of TIP47 are disputed, despite the designation of M6PRBP1 as TIP47's gene symbol. TIP47 protein is most commonly described in the scientific literature as a coat protein for lipid droplets.

TIP47 belongs to the peripilin protein family and shares significant homology with the other genes of this family, including perilipin and adipophilin.

Interactions
M6PRBP1 has been shown to interact with both Mannose 6-phosphate receptors.

References

Further reading

External links